Giovanni Battista Niccolini (29 October 1782 – 20 September 1861) was an Italian poet and playwright of the Italian unification movement or Risorgimento.

Life
In 1782, Niccolini was born in Bagni San Giuliano to a family of limited means. He initiated studied in law at the University of Pisa, but also pursued studies in classical languages. The upheavals of the Napoleonic era and the early death of his father, led him to seek employment. In 1807, he was named professor of history and mythology at the Accademia di Belle Arti of Florence.

He wrote his first play in Greek in 1810. The play was strongly based on Greek legend and it was called Polissena. This tragedy about the sacrifice of a virgin was so favourably received that his next three plays were also tragedies. He also served as librarian and tutor. Despite his republican leanings, he was spared retribution by the administration of the returning Grand Duke Ferdinand III, and obtained a post as Palatine librarian.

Over the years, Niccolini became more attached to the scholarly pre-eminence of classic learning, but also in the pre-eminence of the Tuscan dialect and writers such as Dante. In the post-napoleonic years, controversy arose about the Accademia della Crusca's dominance in defining the Italian language. In the 1820s, and unexpected inheritance from his maternal family, gave him some financial stability. In 1827, his play Foscarini, was mostly praised by audiences, although maligned by others for presumed anti-Catholic themes. His next play (1831) based on the controversial history of Giovanni da Procida, seen in this work as a defender of Italian liberty, faced opposition by both the French and Austrian diplomats. In 1834, he published another tragedy based on events of Italian history of Ludovico Sforza. This was followed by Rosmonda d'Inghilterra in 1839. In 1847, he published Filippo Strozzi, in which the Florentine hero fights against foreign forces for the liberty of his Tuscany.

In 1846 his play, Arnold of Brescia: A Tragedy. was translated by the English immigrant Theodosia Trollope into English and published. This work was also taken up by Robert Browning. The work evoked the patriotism of those seeking to free Italy from the control of foreign and papal forces.

Niccolini died in Florence in 1861. He is buried in the Church of Santa Croce, Florence close to Machiavelli.

Works
Polissena (1810)
Edipo (1810–15)
Ino e Temisto (1810–15)
Medea (1810–15)
Nabucco (1815)
Matilde (1815)
Giovanni da Procida (1817)
Antonio Foscarini (1823)
Lodovico il Moro (1833)
Rosmunda d'Inghilterra (1834)
Beatrice Cenci (1838)[49]
Arnaldo da Brescia (1840)
Le Coefore (1844)
Filippo Strozzi (1846)
Mario e i Cimbri (1848)

On popular culture 
Some of his words were used in the book reading by La lettrice sculpture created by Pietro Magni.

Legacy
There is a Via Giovanni Battista Niccolini in Chinatown in Milan.

References

1792 births
1861 deaths
People from the Province of Pisa
Italian poets
Italian male poets
Italian dramatists and playwrights
Italian male dramatists and playwrights
19th-century poets
19th-century Italian dramatists and playwrights
19th-century Italian male writers